Grant County is a county located in the U.S. state of Wisconsin. As of the 2020 census, the population was 51,938. Its county seat is Lancaster. The county is named after the Grant River, in turn named after a fur trader who lived in the area when Wisconsin was a territory. Grant County comprises the Platteville, WI Micropolitan Statistical Area. It is in the tri-state area of Illinois, Iowa, and Wisconsin, and is crossed by travelers commuting to Madison from a number of eastern Iowan cities, and by residents of northern Illinois traveling to the Twin Cities or La Crosse, Wisconsin.

History

Indian presence
What is now Grant County was largely uninhabited prior to contact with Europeans, as it was a border region between the territories of the Kickapoo, Menominee, and Illinois tribes. The only Native Americans to have a permanent settlement in the area were the Fox tribe, who had a temporary village in what is now the extreme northeast of the county during the mid-1700s.

Colonial period
Between 1520 and 1620 this area was nominally ruled by Spain, although the lack of explorers left the region completely untouched by Spanish authority.  The first Frenchmen to reach what is now Grant County were Jacques Marquette and Louis Joliet, who explored the region in the spring of 1673, after setting out from what would later become Green Bay.  No permanent settlement was made.  In 1680 Louis Hennepin also passed through the region that would later become Grant County, also making no permanent settlement.  In 1689 Nicholas Perrot passed through the territory and claimed it for the King of France.  The first settlement was a temporary trading post that Pierre Marin founded in 1725.

The British technically ruled the region during the period between the French and Indian War and the American Revolution, though no effort was made to settle or administer the region.  After the abandonment of Marin's trading post, the region went unvisited until the expedition of Jonathan Carver, a Connecticut Yankee who passed through what is now Grant County in 1766 during an attempt to discover the Pacific Ocean.

American period
In 1783, the British government acknowledged the jurisdiction of the United States over the land east of the Mississippi River, including what is now Grant County.  American and European traders visiting the region over the next decades were yet as nomadic as the Indians, and no records survive. Grant County was created as part of Wisconsin Territory in 1837. It was named after an Indian trader; his first name, origins, and eventual fate are all unknown.

Geography

Major highways

  U.S. Highway 18
  U.S. Highway 61
  U.S. Highway 151
  Highway 11 (Wisconsin)
  Highway 35 (Wisconsin)
  Highway 80 (Wisconsin)
  Highway 81 (Wisconsin)
  Highway 133 (Wisconsin)

Railroads
BNSF
Wisconsin and Southern Railroad

Buses
Platteville Public Transportation
List of intercity bus stops in Wisconsin

Airports
 KOVS - Boscobel Municipal Airport
 KPVB - Platteville Municipal Airport serves the county and surrounding communities.
 73C - Lancaster Municipal Airport enhances county service.
 C74 - Cassville Municipal Airport

Adjacent counties
 Crawford County, Wisconsin - north
 Richland County, Wisconsin - northeast
 Iowa County, Wisconsin - east
 Lafayette County, Wisconsin - east
 Jo Daviess County, Illinois - southeast
 Dubuque County, Iowa - south
 Clayton County, Iowa - west

Demographics

2020 census
As of the census of 2020, the population was 51,938. The racial makeup of the county was 93.8% White, 1.3% Black or African American, 0.8% Asian, 0.2% Native American, 1.0% from other races, and 2.8% from two or more races. Ethnically, the population was 2.4% Hispanic or Latino of any race.

2000 census
As of the census of 2000, there were 49,597 people, 18,465 households, and 12,390 families residing in the county. The population density was 43 people per square mile (17/km2). There were 19,940 housing units at an average density of 17 per square mile (7/km2). The racial makeup of the county was 98.23% White, 0.52% Black or African American, 0.13% Native American, 0.46% Asian, 0.01% Pacific Islander, 0.14% from other races, and 0.50% from two or more races. 0.56% of the population were Hispanic or Latino of any race. 52.0% were of German, 9.2% English, 8.8% Irish, 6.6% American and 6.4% Norwegian ancestry.

There were 18,465 households, out of which 30.50% had children under the age of 18 living with them, 56.10% were married couples living together, 7.50% had a female householder with no husband present, and 32.90% were non-families. 26.00% of all households were made up of individuals, and 12.10% had someone living alone who was 65 years of age or older. The average household size was 2.51 and the average family size was 3.03.

In the county, the population was spread out, with 23.70% under the age of 18, 14.60% from 18 to 24, 24.80% from 25 to 44, 21.60% from 45 to 64, and 15.30% who were 65 years of age or older. The median age was 36 years. For every 100 females there were 103.00 males. For every 100 females age 18 and over, there were 102.00 males.

Government and infrastructure
The Wisconsin Secure Program Facility (WSPF), a Wisconsin Department of Corrections prison for men, is located in Boscobel in Grant County.

Politics
Grant County has been a reliably Republican county at the federal level for most of its existence. Starting in 1992 however, it voted for the Democratic candidate for President six elections in a row before shifting back to the GOP in 2016.

Communities

Cities
 Boscobel
 Cuba City (partly in Lafayette County)
 Fennimore
 Lancaster (county seat)
 Platteville

Villages

 Bagley
 Bloomington
 Blue River
 Cassville
 Dickeyville
 Hazel Green (partly in Lafayette County)
 Livingston (partly in Iowa County)
 Montfort (partly in Iowa County)
 Muscoda (partly in Iowa County)
 Mount Hope
 Patch Grove
 Potosi
 Tennyson
 Woodman

Towns

 Beetown
 Bloomington
 Cassville
 Castle Rock
 Clifton
 Ellenboro
 Fennimore
 Glen Haven
 Harrison
 Hazel Green
 Hickory Grove
 Jamestown
 Liberty
 Lima
 Little Grant
 Marion
 Millville
 Mount Hope
 Mount Ida
 Muscoda
 North Lancaster
 Paris
 Patch Grove
 Platteville
 Potosi
 Smelser
 South Lancaster
 Waterloo
 Watterstown
 Wingville
 Woodman
 Wyalusing

Census-designated places
 Glen Haven
 Kieler
 Sandy Hook

Unincorporated communities

 Annaton
 Arthur
 Beetown
 Bigpatch
 British Hollow
 Brodtville
 Buena Vista
 Burton
 Castle Rock
 Centerville
 Cornelia
 Diamond Grove
 Ellenboro
 Elmo
 Fair Play
 Five Points
 Flora Fountain
 Georgetown
 Hickory Grove
 Homer
 Hurricane
 Lancaster Junction
 Louisburg
 McCartney
 Millville
 Mount Ida
 North Andover
 Prairie Corners
 Preston
 Rockville
 Rutledge
 Saint Rose
 Shady Dell
 Sinsinawa
 Stitzer
 Union
 Van Buren
 Werley
 Wyalusing

Ghost town/neighborhood
 Pleasant Ridge
 Sinnipee

Notable people
 Willard H. Burney, member of the Nebraska House of Representatives
 B. W. Countryman, member of the South Dakota House of Representatives
 John Lewis Dyer, Methodist circuit rider missionary in Minnesota and Colorado; lead miner in Grant County prior to 1848
 William Garner Waddel, member of the South Dakota Senate

See also
 National Register of Historic Places listings in Grant County, Wisconsin
 Upper Mississippi River National Wildlife and Fish Refuge

Footnotes

Further reading
 Commemorative Biographical Record of the Counties of Rock, Green, Grant, Iowa, and Lafayette, Wisconsin, Containing Biographical Sketches of Prominent and Representative Citizens, and of Many of the Early Settled Families. Chicago: J. H. Beers and Co., 1901.
 History of Grant County, Wisconsin. Chicago: Western Historical Company, 1881.

External links
 Grant County Official Government Website
 Grant County map from the Wisconsin Department of Transportation
 Grant County Health and Demographic Data
 Grant County Sheriff's Office

 
Wisconsin counties on the Mississippi River
1837 establishments in Wisconsin Territory
Populated places established in 1837